JS Izumo (DDH-183) is a helicopter carrier which, as of 2022, is being converted into a light aircraft carrier. She is the second warship to be named for Izumo Province, with the previous ship being the armored cruiser  (1898).

The ruling Liberal Democratic Party announced in May 2018 that it favours converting Izumo to operate fixed-wing aircraft. The conversion was confirmed in December 2018 when Japan announced the change of its defense guidelines. Upon the completion of the process, Izumo will be the first Japanese naval vessel to operate fixed-wing aircraft since World War II.

Design and construction
The construction of the first ship of the Izumo class began in 2011 at an IHI Marine United shipyard in Yokohama, with funding totalling 113.9 billion yen ($1.5 billion) being set aside in the fiscal 2010 budget for this purpose.

Izumo, the largest Japanese naval vessel since World War II, was laid down on 27 January 2012 and launched on 6 August 2013. The ship began sea trials on 29 September 2014. The ship was commissioned on 25 March 2015.

The ship is as large as a Japanese carrier of Second World War-era. Izumo is called a destroyer because the Japanese constitution forbids the acquisition of offensive weapons, but the vessel allows Japan to project military power well beyond its territorial waters.

Characteristics

Aircraft carried

The ship can carry up to 28 aircraft, or 14 larger aircraft. Only seven ASW helicopters and two SAR helicopters are planned for the initial aircraft complement. For other operations, 400 troops and 50 3.5-ton trucks (or equivalent equipment) can also be carried. The flight deck has five helicopter landing spots that allow simultaneous landings and take-offs.

In 2010, Forecast International reported that some design features were intended to support fixed-wing aircraft such as the Bell-Boeing V-22 Osprey and Lockheed Martin F-35 Lightning II; although neither the Ministry of Defense nor the JMSDF have mentioned the possibility of introducing fixed-wing aircraft. The ship has neither a "ski-jump" nor a catapult, typical features for launching fixed-wing aircraft. If Izumo-class ships were to operate fixed-wing aircraft, they would be limited to STOVL (short take-off, vertical landing) aircraft. Japan has purchased the conventional version of the Lightning II (the F-35A) but may buy the STOVL version (the F-35B) which could be operated from a modified Izumo-class ship. In December 2018, it was announced that the Japanese government would change its defense guidelines and purchase about 40 F-35B fighters to operate them from both Izumo and her sister ship .

Air defense

The ship is equipped with two Phalanx CIWS and two SeaRAM for her defense.

Operational history
Commissioned at Yokosuka port in Japan in March 2015, Izumo became operational in time to take part in a major August 2015 disaster drill conducted in Tokyo, alongside the Japan Coast Guard's large patrol vessel Izu. The two vessels acted as casualty receiving and triage stations during the exercise.

In May 2017 Izumo was deployed to escort , a US supply vessel, to the area off Shikoku. Richard E. Byrds mission was to refuel another US warship that was defending against North Korean missiles. This was the first time a Japanese vessel was deployed to escort a US ship since security legislation was enacted in March 2016. A small protest took place at Yokosuka after Izumos departure, under the belief that the deployment of an aircraft carrier was a violation of Japan's defense-only policy. The destroyer  also joined the mission.

In 2020, Izumo began the conversion to operate F-35B fighter aircraft. Conversion works were to proceed in two stages, with the first to strengthen the heat resistance of the deck and install power supply equipment to enable the departure and arrival of the F-35B. The renovation work to change the bow shape to a quadrangle for the safe operation of the F-35B and the maintenance of the interior compartments are scheduled to be carried out in the second stage, starting from the end of 2024. No plans exist to install a catapult or a sloping runway.

In September 2021, JS Izumo joined British aircraft carrier HMS Queen Elizabeth and other vessels for exercises in the Pacific.

In early October of that year, United States Marine Corps F-35B fighters operated off the Izumo for the first time.

On 31 May 2022, the JMSDF announced that the Izumo, the Takanami-class destroyer JS Takanami (DD-110) and the Murasame-class destroyer JS Kirisame (DD104) will be deployed to RIMPAC 2022.

References

External links
 

Izumo-class helicopter destroyers
Helicopter carriers
2013 ships
Ships built by IHI Corporation